, also known as Okudono, was a feudal domain under the Tokugawa shogunate of Edo period Japan, located in Kamo District and Nukata Districts  of Mikawa Province (part of modern Aichi Prefecture), and in Saku District, Shinano Province, (part of modern Nagano Prefecture)  Japan. The ruling family was the Ogyū-Matsudaira clan.

History
The Ogyū clan was a cadet branch of the Matsudaira clan based in northern Mikawa Province, and were hereditary vassals of the Tokugawa clan. Matsudaira Masatsugu was awarded a 6000 koku hatamoto post within the Tokugawa shogunate for his services in the Battle of Osaka. His son, Matsudaira Noritsugu, increased to 16,000 koku, and was thus promoted to the ranks of the fudai daimyō in 1684.

In 1713, Matsudaira Norizane moved the seat of the domain from mountainous Ogyū (in what is now the northern portion of the city of Toyota to the more conveniently located Okutono location (in what is now part of the city of Okazaki. However, the domain suffered greatly due to inclement weather and flooding of the Yasaku River during the Kyōhō period, which led to crop failure and famine. The problems were repeated during the Great Tenpō Famine of 1832–36, although the domain was able to escape the more severe effects of the famine due to reforms implemented by its lord, Matsudaira Noritoshi.

In the Bakumatsu period, the domain achieved prominence thanks to its last daimyō, Matsudaira Norikata, who served as a senior councilor in the final years of the Tokugawa shogunate. Another contemporary figure born in Okutono was Nagai Naoyuki. During Norikata's tenure, the domain seat was moved from Mikawa Province to the Tanokuchi district of Shinano Province (though the holdings remained unchanged), and with the construction of Tatsuoka Castle, the domain also became known as Tatsuoka Domain. The domain was dissolved by the Meiji restoration in 1871 with the abolition of the han system.

Holdings at the end of the Edo period
As with most domains in the han system, Okutono Domain consisted of several discontinuous territories calculated to provide the assigned kokudaka, based on periodic cadastral surveys and projected agricultural yields. 

Mikawa Province 
28 villages in Kamo District
7 villages in Nukata District
Shinano Province
24 villages in Saku District

List of daimyō 

 Ogyū-Matsudaira clan, 1703–1871 (fudai)

 As  
{| class=wikitable
! #||Name || Tenure || Courtesy title || Court Rank || kokudaka|| Lineage
|-
||1||Matsudaira Noritsugu (松平乗次)||1684–1687|| Nuidono-no-kami (縫殿頭)|| Lower 5th (従五位下)|| 16,000 koku ||son of hatamoto Matsudaira Naotsugu
|-
||2||Matsudaira Norinari (松平乗成)||1687–1703|| Nuidono-no-kami (縫殿頭)|| Lower 5th (従五位下)|| 16,000 koku||son of Noritsugu
|-
||3||Matsudaira Norizane (松平乗真)||1703–1711|| Nuidono-no-kami (縫殿頭)|| Lower 5th (従五位下)|| 16,000 koku||son of hatamoto Honda Masatane
|-
|}

 As  
{| class=wikitable
! #||Name || Tenure || Courtesy title || Court Rank || kokudaka||Lineage
|-
||3||Matsudaira Norizane ( 松平乗真)||1711–1716||Nuidono-no-kami (縫殿頭)|| Lower 5th (従五位下)|| 16,000 koku||transfer from Ogyū
|-
||4||Matsudaira Mitsunori (松平盈乗)||1716–1742|| Nuidono-no-kami (縫殿頭)|| Lower 5th (従五位下)|| 16,000 koku|| son of Norizane
|-
||5||Matsudaira Noriyasu (松平乗穏)||1742–1782|| Iwami-no-kami (石見守)  || Lower 5th (従五位下)|| 16,000 koku||son of Mitsunori
|-
||6||Matsudaira Noritomo (松平乗友)||1782–1790|| Hyōbu-no-shō (兵部少輔) || Lower 5th (従五位下)|| 16,000 koku||2nd son of Noriyasu
|-
||7||Matsudaira Noritada (松平乗尹)||1790–1802|| Mondo-no-kami (主水正) || Lower 5th (従五位下)|| 16,000 koku||4th son of Noriyasu
|-
||8||Matsudaira Noriyoshi (松平乗羨)||1802–1827|| Nuidono-no-kami(縫殿頭)|| Lower 5th (従五位下)|| 16,000 koku||2nd son of Noritomo
|-
||9||Matsudaira Noritoshi (松平乗利)||1827–1852|| Iwami-no-kami(石見守)|| Lower 5th (従五位下)|| 16,000 koku||son of Noriyoshi
|-
||10||Matsudaira Norikata (松平乗謨)||1852–1863|| Nuidono-no-kami (縫殿頭)|| Lower 5th (従五位下)|| 16,000 koku||2nd son of Noritoshi
|-
|}

 As   
{| class=wikitable
! #||Name || Tenure || Courtesy title || Court Rank || kokudaka||Lineage
|-
||10||Matsudaira Norikata (松平乗謨)||1863–1871|| Nuidono-no-kami (縫殿頭)||  Lower 5th (従五位下)|| 16,000 koku||transfer from Okutono
|-
|}

See also 
 List of Han

References

External links
 "Okutono" at Edo 300

Notes

Domains of Japan
History of Nagano Prefecture
1684 establishments in Japan
States and territories established in 1684
1871 disestablishments in Japan
States and territories disestablished in 1871
Mikawa Province
Shinano Province
Domains of Aichi Prefecture
Ogyū-Matsudaira clan